Arthur Frederick Rykert (April 20, 1870 – May 30, 1933) was a physician and political figure in Ontario. He represented Wentworth North in the Legislative Assembly of Ontario from 1914 to 1919 as a Conservative member.

He was born in St. Catharines, Ontario, the son of J.C. Rykert and N.M. Hawley and the grandson of George Rykert, and was educated in St. Catharines, at Upper Canada College and at Toronto University. In 1908, Rykert married Nellie Shaw. He served as coroner for Wentworth County. Rykert died in Toronto of heart disease at the age of 63.

References

External links

1870 births
1933 deaths
Progressive Conservative Party of Ontario MPPs
Canadian coroners